Rex Reed Boggan (March 27, 1930 - December 8, 1985) was an American football player. 

Boggan was born in Tupelo, Mississippi, in 1930. He attended Memphis Technical High School in Memphis, Tennessee.

He attended the University of Mississippi and played college football at the tackle position for the Ole Miss Rebels football team from 1949 to 1950 and in 1954. Between 1950 and 1953, his college career was interrupted by his service in the United States Marine Corps during the Korean War. In December 1953, he was selected as the most valuable player from the Navy and Marine Corps football teams of 1953. As a senior, he led the 1954 Ole Miss Rebels football team to the SEC championship and the No 6 ranking in the final AP poll. He was selected by the Associated Press as a first-team player on its 1954 All-America college football team. 

Boggan was drafted by the New York Giants in the 20th round of the 1952 NFL Draft and played for the Giants during the 1955 season at the defensive tackle position. He appeared in 11 NFL games, all of them as a starter. In August 1956, a large calcium deposit fused the two major bones in his right leg. The condition ended his football career.

Boggan died in 1985 after suffering a heart attack at his home in Spartanburg, South Carolina.

References

1930 births
1985 deaths
American football defensive tackles
Ole Miss Rebels football players
New York Giants players
Players of American football from Mississippi
Sportspeople from Tupelo, Mississippi